This is a list of malls in Washington (state). These are the main malls found in the state, location grouped by county.

References

Shopping malls
Washington